Alphonsus Gerald Irona is a Nigerian politician who serves as deputy governor of Imo state.

References

Living people
Year of birth missing (living people)
Place of birth missing (living people)
State deputy governors of Nigeria
Imo State politicians